The Mary Onettes is the self-titled debut album from Swedish dream pop band the Mary Onettes. The album was released on 25 April 2007 in Sweden to generally positive critical acclaim and favorable comparisons to Echo & the Bunnymen, the Cure, the Church and Shout Out Louds. Treble magazine, in a highly positive review, described the album: "It may sound a bit on the nostalgic side, though its influences merely melt into a greater whole, in which various sounds meld together in synth-pop ecstasy". Two singles were released from the album: the Lost EP in November 2006, and "Void," which preceded the album in March 2007. A music video was also produced for the lead track, "Pleasure Songs".

Track listing

Release history

Credits 
 All songs recorded and produced by Philip Ekström, except:
 "Pleasure Songs" recorded and produced by Lars Malmros.
 "Void" recorded and produced by Philip Ekström and Henrik Ekström.
 Recorded at the House Arrest Studio, Gothenburg.
 Strings on "Still" by Karin Hagström (violin) and Lina Molander (viola) from the quartet Qvartiett.
 Arranged by Philip Ekström.
 Mixed by Philip Ekström and Henrik Ekström.
 Mastered at Cutting Room by Thomas Eberger.
 Photos by Henrik Mårtensson; sleeve design by Peter Eriksson.

References 

2007 debut albums
The Mary Onettes albums
Labrador Records albums